Richard Kaye (born 30 September 1967 in Harrogate, Yorkshire) is a British former auto racing driver. He comes from a family heavily involved in motor-sport. His older brother James is a driver and his father Peter, worked as his engineer and team principal. He now works as a racing instructor and team manager.

Early career
His racing career started in road rallying at the age of seventeen, progressing to stage rally racing. In 1988 he switched to circuit racing, finishing as runner-up in the St Helens Ford XR3i Challenge. He won his first title in 1989, becoming the St Helens Ford XR2i champion. From then he only did occasional racing, until 1993 when he raced in the Ford Fiesta XR2 Challenge, finishing in fourth place. He finished as runner-up in the series in 1994, including seven race wins.

BTCC

In 1995 he stepped up to the British Touring Car Championship with the new family run Mint Motorsport Team, racing a former works Ford Mondeo. He ended his first season in the BTCC second in the Total Cup for Privateers, just five points behind independent champion Matt Neal. The team switched to a former Ray Mallock Ltd ran Vauxhall Cavalier for 1996. Again Kaye finished as runner-up in the independents cup behind Lee Brookes, despite finishing above him in the overall points table. He did not drive in the 1997 season, instead moving to team manager at Team Dynamics.

Racing record

Complete British Touring Car Championship results
(key) (Races in bold indicate pole position - 1 point awarded 1996 onwards) (Races in italics indicate fastest lap)

External links
BTCC Pages Profile.

1967 births
Living people
English racing drivers
British Touring Car Championship drivers
European Touring Car Cup drivers

Engstler Motorsport drivers